Oscar Point is a small rock point along the north shore of Terra Nova Bay, 1 nautical mile (1.9 km) northwest of Markham Island, in Victoria Land. Discovered by the British Antarctic Expedition, 1898–1900, and named for King Oscar of Norway and Sweden. C.E. Borchgrevink, the leader of this expedition, was a native of Norway. Originally charted by Borchgrevink as an island, the feature is now known to be joined to the coast.

Headlands of Victoria Land
Scott Coast